Quercus schottkyana is an Asian species of tree in the beech family Fagaceae. It has been found in southwestern China (Guizhou, Sichuan, Yunnan). It is placed in subgenus Cerris, section Cyclobalanopsis.

Quercus schottkyana is a tree up to 20 meters tall. Twigs are grayish-green. Leaves can be as much as 12 cm long, thick and leathery. A SW Chinese endemic evergreen oak, related to Q. glauca, but with the new foliage densely white hairy and pinky-red, turning green above and glaucous beneath, serrated and with a drawn out tip. A handsome Cyclobalanopsis oak, rare in cultivation

References

External links
line drawing, Flora of China Illustrations vol. 4, fig. 378, drawing 2 at upper right as Cyclobalanopsis glaucoides 
photo of herbarium specimen at Missouri Botanical Garden, collected in Yunnan
 http://www.panglobalplants.com/plants-for-sale/[ in UK]

schottkyana
Flora of China
Plants described in 1912